Panchkhal is a Municipality in Kavrepalanchok District in the Bagmati Zone of central Nepal. Panchkhal has an area of 103 km² and Density: 386.6/km²  according to 2011 census. Glacial strand retreat and fluvial incision led to
develop landscapes and evolve the area having a
relief of about 122 to 750 m. At the time of the 2011 Nepal census it had a population of 35340 & 8948 houses combining of previous VDC that were merged.
Previous Aniakot, HokseBazar, Kharelthok, Koshidekha, Baluwa & Panchkhal VDC was merged to form agriculturally rich Panchkhal Municipality.

Climate 
Panchkhal has average temperatures of 24.9 °C and average low 11.66 °C throughout the year. Temperatures may rise up to 38 °C in the summer season and winter are generally dry with record low temperature of -10 °C in 2008. Average rainfall is about 10.2 cm throughout the year. Rainfall is mostly monsoon-based (about 65% of the total concentrated during the monsoon months of June to August), and decreases substantially (100 to 200 cm (39 to 79 in)) from eastern Nepal to western Nepal. In the winter season it rarely rains which creates harsh condition for farmers who mainly depends on rain for irrigation.

Economy

Tourism 
Panchkhal is near to the one of the reputed tourist destination of the country,Dhulikhel and Panauti, and its natural environment and the culture and traditions of the people living here attracts tourists. Panchkhal shares some resorts with Dhulikhel and one of it is Dhulikhel Mountain Resort located in ward number-5 panchkhal.

Special Economic Zone 
A budget of Rs 1.2 billion has been estimated for the construction of SEZ in Panchkhal. The construction of infrastructure at the Panchkhal economic zone, touted as a major facility to promote trade with China. The government has already acquired 1,000 ropanis of land—600 ropanis from the Devisthan Padula Subarnashwori Community Forest and 400 ropanis from the Sikharpur Community Forest. The Industry Ministry has paid Rs200 million to the Ministry of Forest for the land. If the SEZ is brought into operation, more than 50 large factories can be operated there. It can also provide warehousing facilities for goods imported from China.

The Nepal government has a plan to add oil depots in Panchkhal.

Educational facilities 
 Shree Sarbamangala Higher Secondary School

Army Base 
Nepal Army Birendra Peace Operations Training Centre (BPOTC) is a training institute of Nepal which is dedicated for providing training to all Nepalese Army personnel participating in various UNPKO. 

The Nepalese Army established an ad hoc "Peace Keeping Training Camp" in 1986, which was subsequently restructured into a dedicated Training centre in 2001. It was renamed as Birendra Peace Operations Training Center with the motto "PEACE WITH HONOUR".

Reference

Populated places in Kavrepalanchok District
Nepal municipalities established in 2014
Municipalities in Bagmati Province